Leopold Quehl (1849–1922, Halle an der Saale) was a German amateur botanist who specialized in Cactaceae.

Biography

Quehl was employed as a postal worker in Halle. Around 1873 he developed an interest in cacti, and subsequently amassed a large collection of living plants as well as creating a herbarium. He was the binomial authority of numerous species within the family Cactaceae, of which he published his findings in the Monatsschrift für Kakteenkunde.

Quehl was a founding member of Deutsche Kakteen-Gesellschaft (DKG).

Legacy
Plants with the specific epithets of quehlianum and quehlianus are named in his honor; examples being:
 Echinocactus quehlianus (F.Haage ex Quehl).
 Gymnocalycium quehlianum (F.Haage ex Quehl) Vaupel ex Hosseus).

References 

1849 births
1922 deaths
19th-century German botanists
People from Halle (Saale)
20th-century German botanists